Nadi Thaqafi Tulkarm Al-Riyadhi or simply Thaqafi Tulkarem is a Palestinian professional football team based in Tulkarem, that plays in the West Bank Premier League.
İt was founded in 1970.

External links 

Thaqafi Tulkarm Website
League at fifa.com

1970 establishments in the Israeli Military Governorate
Association football clubs established in 1970
Football clubs in the West Bank